Pegasus Airlines Flight 2193 was a scheduled domestic passenger flight from Izmir to Istanbul in Turkey operated by Pegasus Airlines. On 5 February 2020, the Boeing 737-800 operating the route skidded off the runway while landing at Istanbul-Sabiha Gökçen International Airport, Turkey. Three people were killed, 179 people were injured, and the aircraft was destroyed. It was the first fatal accident in the airline's history. The accident came less than a month after another Pegasus Airlines accident (Flight 747) involving a Boeing 737 skidding off the runway at the same airport.

Aircraft and crew 

The aircraft was a Boeing 737-86J (registration ), serial number 37742. It was 11 years old at the time of the crash, having first flown in January 2009. The plane had previously been operated by the now-defunct German airline Air Berlin before being acquired by Pegasus in May 2016. Prior to the crash, Pegasus was scheduled to withdraw this aircraft once leasing expired, as the airline plans to move to an all-Airbus fleet in the future.

The captain was Mahmut Aslan, and the first officer was Ferdinand Pondaag, a Dutch national.

Accident 
Flight 2193 operated within Turkey from İzmir Adnan Menderes Airport, Izmir, to Istanbul without incident. At approximately 18:30 local time, the plane attempted to land at Sabiha Gökçen in Istanbul in heavy rain and strong tailwinds. A thunderstorm with strong wind gusts was passing through the area at the time of the accident. Two other aircraft aborted their landing attempts at the same airport shortly before Flight 2193 landed.

After what Turkey's transport minister described as a "rough landing," the aircraft failed to decelerate. It skidded off the east end of the runway and plunged into a ditch, impacting with a force that survivors described as like an explosion. The aircraft broke into three sections, with the forward section of the fuselage especially damaged during the incident. Passengers escaped the plane via gaps between the fuselage sections. A fire broke out, and was later extinguished by firefighters.

Turkey's health minister said three passengers were killed and 179 people were taken to local hospitals with injuries. 12 children were believed to be on board the plane, according to reports from the Turkish media. An investigation of the pilots will be launched based on speculations of crew negligence. The pilots received treatment in the hospital, before they were taken to a police station to provide their statements.

Investigation
The CEO of Pegasus Airlines, Mehmet T. Nane, stated that they had recovered the plane’s black boxes, and had begun extracting the data inside. A preliminary report indicated that high tailwinds were present upon landing, and that the pilots, being unaware of this, may have ceased braking efforts prematurely.

See also
 Pegasus Airlines Flight 8622 – Another Pegasus Boeing 737 involved in a runway overrun.
 Air India Express Flight 1344

Notes

References

2020 disasters in Turkey
2020 in Turkey
Accidents and incidents involving the Boeing 737 Next Generation
Aviation accidents and incidents in 2020
Aviation accidents and incidents in Turkey
Airliner accidents and incidents involving runway overruns
February 2020 events in Turkey
Pegasus Airlines accidents and incidents